Eremophila pterocarpa subsp. pterocarpa is a plant in the figwort family, Scrophulariaceae and is endemic to Western Australia.  It is a common and widespread large shrub or small tree with grey leaves and sepals and orange, pink or yellow petals.

Description
The leaves and stems are covered with powder-like short, matted hairs. Most of the leaves have their bases twisted so that the leaves face horizontally.

There are 5 sepals which are narrow egg-shaped to triangular and of approximately equal lengths. As with the leaves, the sepals and petals have a dusty covering of short, fine hairs. Flowering occurs between June and September and is followed by fruits which are flattened and dry with papery wings.

Taxonomy and naming
The species was first formally described in 1904 by William Vincent Fitzgerald in the Journal of the Royal Society of Western Australia. When Robert Chinnock reviewed the genus, he recognised a subspecies - E. pterocarpa subsp. acicularis as well as the type subspecies pterocarpa.

Distribution and habitat
Subspecies pterocarpa occurs between the Cape Range, Shark Bay and Meekatharra areas where it grows in sandy clay or soils derived from limestone, in flats or salty sites.

Conservation
Subspecies pterocarpa is listed as "not threatened" by the Government of Western Australia Department of Parks and Wildlife.

References

Flora of Western Australia
pterocarpa pterocarpa
Plants described in 1904